Vitré may refer to communes in France:

 Vitré, Ille-et-Vilaine
 Vitré, Deux-Sèvres